Limaciopsis is a genus of flowering plants belonging to the family Menispermaceae.

Its native range is Western Central Tropical Africa to Angola.

Species:
 Limaciopsis loangensis Engl.

References

Menispermaceae
Menispermaceae genera